Andrew Fraser is the name of:

People
 Andrew Fraser, 3rd Lord Fraser, Lord Fraser
 Andrew Fraser, Baron Fraser of Corriegarth (1946–2021), a British former banker and Conservative politician
 Andrew Fraser (New South Wales politician) (born 1952), New South Wales Legislative Assembly member
 Andrew Fraser (Queensland politician) (born 1976), former Deputy Premier and Treasurer of Queensland
 Sir Andrew Henderson Leith Fraser (1848–1919), lieutenant-governor of Bengal, 1903–1908
 Andrew Fraser (lawyer), Australian lawyer imprisoned on drug charges
 Andy Fraser (1952–2015), English musician
 Drew Fraser (born 1944), Canadian-born Australian academic, law professor at Macquarie University in Sydney, New South Wales

Fictional characters
 Andrew Fraser (Emmerdale), a fictional character from the ITV soap opera Emmerdale
 Andrew Fraser (First Among Equals), a fictional character from the novel First Among Equals by Jeffrey Archer

See also
 Andrew Frazer (disambiguation)